John Gee Clark (March 23, 1890 - November 11, 1984) served in the California State Assembly for the 70th district from 1935 to 1939. During World War I he served in the United States Army.

References

1890 births
1984 deaths
United States Army personnel of World War I
20th-century American politicians
Democratic Party members of the California State Assembly